Mychocerinus is a genus of beetles in the family Murmidiidae. There are at least two described species in Mychocerinus.

Species
These two species belong to the genus Mychocerinus:
 Mychocerinus arizonensis (Lawrence & Stephan, 1975)
 Mychocerinus depressus (LeConte, 1866)

References

Coccinelloidea genera
Articles created by Qbugbot